Tania Habimana is a Rwandan Belgian entrepreneur and television presenter.

Habimana is the anchor for CNBC Africa's primetime financial markets and business show Closing Bell, broadcast weekdays on DSTV Channel 410.

Prior to this, Habimana served as CEO of NONZēRO Africa, an integrated marketing company with focus on creating impact programs and enterprise development campaigns in Africa. The company was founded in 2016 by herself and Desiree Brouwer, and has since grown as an SME marketing agency, assisting small businesses to expand using advanced data-based digital marketing techniques. Habimana is also the co-founder of the Threads Stitched by Standard Bank, an 18-week accelerator built in collaboration with Standard Bank, Mercedes-Benz, EOH, SA Tourism, Kaya FM and Mecer Electronics, designed to teach fashion entrepreneurs about the business side of fashion.

Habimana also co-founded FASHIONTech™ Africa hackathon & conference, a first-of-its-kind 24-hour fashion technology hackathon & conference which took place in Johannesburg, South Africa in April 2018.

Habimana is the television host of Tailored Business. The show follows the journey of suit entrepreneur and tailor, Tania Habimana, as she travels across Africa making suits for prominent business people and personalities. As she is measuring the guests up, she interviews them on their journey towards success, but also challenges and opportunities on the African continent.

Habimana was recognised by the European Commission for her efforts to promote the internationalisation of youth. She is now the face of the British Council for the Erasmus+ Youth Mobility program.

Early life 
Habimana was born in 1989 in Saint-Martin-d'Hères in France. She attended Palmerston Primary School in Barry, Vale of Glamorgan.

She attended secondary school at the Institut Notre-Dame de Bonne Espérence in Braine-le-Comte in Belgium and later attended, Cardiff University where she studied a Bachelor of Science in Business Management & German Language, with a year spent as an Erasmus student at University of Konstanz. During her time at Cardiff University and as a means to fund her studies, Habimana founded the dance group, Slash Hip Hop Dance.

After some years in the corporate world, Habimana later studied at the Erasmus University Rotterdam in the Netherlands. She obtained a Master of Science in International Management, a program part of the Global Alliance in Management Education, with which she also studied Fashion & Luxury Brand Management at Bocconi University in Milan, Italy .

Business career

Early career 
Habimana started her career as an eCommerce analyst and digital marketer working for companies such as Levi Strauss & Co and luxury menswear brand Suitsupply.

Suitsupply's Market-Entry into Sub-Sahara Africa

eCommerce in Africa 
After a mid-career study break and completing her master's degree in International Management, Habimana returned to Suitsupply as GM for Sub-Sahara Africa and led the expansion of Suitsupply into Sub-Sahara Africa aged only 23. Led by Habimana's eCommerce experience, the company was the first European retailer to integrate local payment systems such as M-Pesa, Airtel Money and YuCash onto their eCommerce platform. The company first launched an eCommerce platform in that delivered across Sub-Sahara Africa within 4 business days.

Store in Johannesburg 
The company had planned a Pan African, multi-channel roll-out, which started with the opening of the brick and mortar store in Johannesburg in June 2014.

The store was in a 2-storey luxury Mansion in Johannesburg's upmarket neighbourhood Hyde Park, Gauteng.

Pop-Up in Nigeria 
Habimana also organised pop-ups in Lagos, Nigeria.

Television host career

Tailored Business TV show 
Synopsis : "A young female entrepreneur travels across Africa making suits for successful business people.She uses the suit fitting appointment as an opportunity to interview her prominent clients and gain tips & insights on how to grow her own pan-African business."

Habimana created the show after realising the number of untold stories of everyday African entrepreneurs, her ambition was to showcase African entrepreneurial excellence as well as provide an avenue whereby real, practical tips and advice could be shared.

The show was sponsored by airline KLM and automobile brand Mercedes-Benz.

VC4A Academy host and expert 
Habimana is the theoretical content host of the VC4A Startup Academy online videos series.

Closing Bell host 
In 2021, Habimana became the permanent host of CNBC Africa's prime time show Closing Bell

Closing Bell  takes a close-up look at how the markets are moving on that day, what drove them and how investors, as well as analysts, are reacting. We also take a look at macro-economic breaking news and current affairs that have the potential to affect businesses on the continent and provide our audience with the information they need. On the show, Habimana interviews analysts, investment managers, executives and CEOs who’ll explain their strategies, share opinions, and provide insights on issues affecting the African business environment.

Entrepreneurial career

Habimana House Ltd 
Habimana is the founder and majority shareholder of company, Habimana House Ltd, headquartered in London. Habimana House is a multi-faceted production company dedicated to promoting African business success as well as the Diaspora to a global audience.

NONZēRO Africa 
Habimana is the co-founder and a shareholder of NONZēRO Africa, headquartered in Johannesburg. The company was founded in 2016 by Desiree Brouwer and Tania Habimana. In 2019, Habimana was appointed CEO of the organisation. The company is best known for its flagship program, Threads Stitched by Standard Bank, a business of fashion accelerator program deployed in 4 cities in South Africa.

Awards and recognition 
Habimana was awarded with two high-profile roles during the Erasmus+ 30 Year campaign. She was nominated as the UK ambassador for this program and was also awarded the UK's nine millionth award. The award was handed to her from the European Parliament President Antonio Tajani.

Habimana was selected as a German French Young Leaders in 2018, under the high patronage of Presidents Emmanuel Macron and Frank-Walter Steinmeier. During which, she presented during the inaugural event a talk titled "Needs-based innovation from Africa - What Europe can learn".

Habimana was nominated in the category 'Global Hero' of the Digital Female Leader 2018 edition.

Habimana was also awarded 'SMME Brand Contributor Of The Year' in 2019, by Brand Summit South Africa.

References

Year of birth missing (living people)
Living people
Women chief executives
Belgian chief executives
Alumni of Cardiff University
University of Konstanz alumni
People from Saint-Martin-d'Hères
Erasmus University Rotterdam alumni
Belgian television presenters
Belgian women television presenters